Credito Emiliano S.p.A. (Credem) is an Italian bank based in Reggio Emilia, Emilia-Romagna. The company is a component of FTSE Italia Mid Cap Index .

According to a research by Mediobanca, Credito Emiliano was ranked the 11th largest bank in Italy by total assets as of 31 December 2015, despite several banking group were omitted in the research. If omitting central banks, postal savings and subsidiaries of foreign banking groups, the bank was ranked 10th, (9th among retail and commercial conglomerates if omitting investment banks and insurance-bank conglomerates of Italy such as Banca Mediolanum and Mediobanca). Due to its size, the bank was supervised by European Central Bank directly, as part of the Single Supervisory Mechanism (as 1 of the 14 Italian banking groups).

The company also had several internal divisions: Credem Banca (retail banking), Credem Banca d'Impresa (corporate banking) and Credem Private Banking.

History
Founded in 1910 as Banca Agricola Commerciale di Reggio Emilia, the bank changed its name to Credito Emiliano in 1983. At that time the bank also acquired Banca Belinzaghi of Milan, starting its expansion. In 1991 Istituto Bancario Siciliano was acquired, followed by Banca di Girgenti and Banca Industriale Agricola di Radicena.

The Group acquired Banca Popolare Vittorio Emanuele di Paternò, Banca Euromobiliare, BCC Corleone, Banca Creditwest e dei Comuni Vesuviani, Banca Tamborino Sangiovanni, Banca Popolare San Marco Argentano, BCC Ciminna, BCC Bonifati, BCC Curinga, Banca dei Comuni Nolani, 3 branches of Deutsche Bank in Catania, BCC San Giovanni Gemini, Banca della Provincia di Napoli from 1994 to 1998. In 1999, the bank was ranked 8th in terms of branches on Sicily island.

From 1999 to 2008 Banca Popolare Dauna, BCC Fortore-Miscano, BCC San Fili, BCC Jonica, BCC Alto Crotonese, Banca Popolare Andriese, Banca dei Laghi, Banca di Latina, Euromobiliare Corporate Finance, Credimmobili and Anteprima were acquired.

Shareholders
On 1 January 1993 Credito Emiliano Holding was formed as the holding company for the bank. Currently owned 75.57% stake, with the rest were floated in Borsa Italiana. The largest shareholders of Credem Holding were Cofimar S.r.l. and Max Mara Finance S.r.l., which in turn owned 29.44% and 8.30% stake of the bank respectively.

Subsidiaries and joint venture
bank
 Banca Euromobiliare
specialized bank
 Credemleasing
 Credemfactor
 Credem Private Equity SGR
 Euromobiliare Fiduciaria 
 Euromobiliare Asset Management SGR
insurance companies
 Credemvita
 Credemassicurazioni (50-50 joint venture with Reale Mutua Assicurazioni)

References 

Banks of Italy
Banks established in 1910
Companies based in Reggio Emilia
Italian companies established in 1910
Banks under direct supervision of the European Central Bank